The Incredibles is an action-adventure video game based on Pixar's 2004 film of the same name and published by THQ and by D3 Publisher in Japan. The GameCube, PlayStation 2, and Xbox versions were developed by Heavy Iron Studios, while Beenox handled the Microsoft Windows and Mac OS X versions, and the Game Boy Advance version was developed by Helixe. Samuel L. Jackson (Frozone/Lucius Best), Spencer Fox (Dash), Sarah Vowell (Violet), and Jason Lee (Buddy Pine/Incrediboy; Syndrome is absent from the game on the console and PC versions aside from scenes directly taken from the film) are the only actors to reprise their roles from the film, with the rest of the cast, including Craig T. Nelson and Holly Hunter, being replaced with other voice actors - the original movie dialogue and can be heard in cutscenes taken directly from the film. The game's music was composed by Michael Giacchino, who also scored the film. The console versions of the game received a T rating from the ESRB, making this is the only Pixar video game to receive that rating.

Plot
The mime-styled, French supervillain Bomb Voyage attempts a bank heist in the fictional American city of Metroville, but Bob Parr, alias Mr. Incredible, guided by his friend, the ice-powered superhero Frozone (secretly Lucius Best), works to stop his plans. Meanwhile, the metamorphic heroine Elastigirl battles against Voyage's mime minions across the Metroville skyline stretch. Mr. Incredible captures Bomb Voyage in the bank when his fanboy, Buddy Pine, shows up. Mr. Incredible is dismissive of Buddy Pine, and Bomb Voyage sneakily plants a bomb on Buddy's cape, who flies away with his rocket boots to notify the police. Mr. Incredible fortunately notices the bomb on Buddy's cape and grabs hold of Buddy to embark on a wild ride above the city.

Mr. Incredible and the bomb both fall onto a rooftop, where the bomb detonates harmlessly as Bomb Voyage appears in a helicopter. Voyage attempts to kill Mr. Incredible with bombs, rockets and laser beams, but Mr. Incredible throws the bombs back at the helicopter, causing it to spin wildly out of control, heavily damaged. Bomb Voyage flees the scene, Mr. Incredible having defeated his madcap foe.

Fifteen years later, superheroes across America have been long-since sued and outlawed for causing too much public destruction and are forced by the US government (chiefly the CIA) to permanently remain themselves in their civilian identities and live normal lives in hiding. Mr. Incredible has married Elastigirl, who has become Helen Parr, and they have three children together: Violet (who possesses force-field and invisibility powers), Dash (a 190+ mph speedster), and Jack-Jack (who does not appear to have obtained any superhuman abilities).

After narrowly escaping an apartment inferno on an illegal heroic excursion with Frozone, Mr. Incredible is approached by a mysterious woman named Mirage, who tells him about a secret organization based on a remote South Pacific island called Nomanisan. Meanwhile, Dash is late for school and has to race through the Metroville traffic to reach his school on time.

The organization's latest invention, the Omnidroid Mark 08, is endangering the island and its personnel. After a rough beach landing on Nomanisan Island, Mr. Incredible encounters numerous hostile robots before he finds and destroys the Omnidroid during a volcanic eruption. The entire battle is witnessed by Mirage and her anonymous employer through the eyes of a robotic bird. The shadowy employer remarks that Mr. Incredible's victory is surprising, and asks Mirage to issue him new assignments.

After weeks of rigorous training and having received an improved suit from superhero tailor Edna Mode, Mr. Incredible returns to Nomanisan well-prepared for another mission. When he reaches the conference room, he fights through numerous armed security guards, deadly robots and laser systems in the robot arena, but once he reaches the empty meeting room, an improved Omnidroid (the Mark 09), appears suddenly from behind a huge sliding wall and grabs Mr. Incredible, quickly overpowering and trapping him. The Omnidroid's creator, Syndrome, appears, who is Mirage's secret employer and reveals himself to be an adult (and very hostile) Buddy Pine. He reveals that he wants revenge on Mr. Incredible by killing off him and the world's other superheroes. Mr. Incredible is remorseful for his treatment of Syndrome, and escapes his clutches by jumping off the great falls. He evades Syndrome's life-sign scanner by hiding behind the skeletal remains of his superhero friend Gazerbeam (whom Syndrome had previously dispatched in an undersea cave). Unfortunately, he is later captured and imprisoned in Syndrome's base when he breaks into the villain's secret computer room, learning of Syndrome's plans to unleash his perfected Omnidroid (the Mark 10) on Metroville. Syndrome then intends to take credit for stopping the robot and saving the city, tarnishing the reputations of Mr. Incredible and his allies in the process, before he becomes the world's only super using his weaponized inventions.

Elastigirl flies to Nomanisan island to rescue her husband and safely stores a stowed-away Violet and Dash in a cave, sneaking into Syndrome's complex with the goal of finding Mr. Incredible. She works her way through the hidden base and into Syndrome's volcanic lair. The next morning, Violet and Dash accidentally activate a robotic cockatoo's alarm system and are forced to use their powers to escape from Syndrome's guards. After a 100-mile dash through the jungle and across the beaches and lakes of the island, and Violet's crossing of Syndrome's henchmen (thanks to the use of her invisibility), the two learn not to be ashamed of their powers and work together, combining their abilities to form the Incredi-ball. They battle henchmen and robots, eventually finding their parents, with Mirage having had a change of heart and freeing Mr. Incredible.

As the Incredible family finally meets up outside the secret lava labs, Mirage helps them activate and launch one of Syndrome's rockets from the rocket silo, which they use to reach Metroville, where the Omnidroid is wreaking havoc on the populace. The Incredibles and Frozone work together to destroy the robot, stop Syndrome and save the world. Syndrome escapes from the battle in the city, but is later killed offscreen when he attempts to kidnap Jack-Jack Parr as revenge. The Incredibles meet with their family friend and CIA agent Rick Dicker, who acquits and relieves them of their lives as superheroes in hiding, and they are loved by the public again for their efforts.

Reception

The Incredibles received "mixed" reviews on all platforms according to the review aggregation website Metacritic. In Japan, where it was ported on December 2, 2004, Famitsu gave it a score of 29 out of 40 for the PlayStation 2 version, and 23 out of 40 for the Game Boy Advance version.

Sales
According to the NPD Group, The Incredibles was one of the best-selling movie-based video games from 2004 to 2005, generating $57.4 million in profit. In the United States, The Incredibles Game Boy Advance release sold 1 million copies and earned $29 million by August 2006. During the period between January 2000 and August 2006, it was the 15th highest-selling game launched for the Game Boy Advance, Nintendo DS or PlayStation Portable in that country.

By July 2006, the PlayStation 2 version of The Incredibles had sold 740,000 copies and earned $24 million in the United States. Next Generation ranked it as the 87th highest-selling game launched for the PlayStation 2, Xbox or GameCube between January 2000 and July 2006 in that country. Combined console sales of the Incredibles series reached 1.5 million units in the United States by July 2006. The PlayStation 2 version also received a "Platinum" sales award from the Entertainment and Leisure Software Publishers Association (ELSPA), indicating sales of at least 300,000 copies in the United Kingdom.

Sequel

Continuing after the events of the game, a sequel titled The Incredibles: Rise of the Underminer was released in 2005. Rise of the Underminer serves as an alternative sequel to the first game and film, featuring Mr. Incredible and Frozone as playable characters, with the option of two-player cooperative play as a new addition. The game revolves around Mr. Incredible and Frozone as they team up together to defeat the Underminer and his robot army from taking over the world. Following the release of Incredibles 2 (2018), it is now non-canon.

Notes

References

External links

2004 video games
Action-adventure games
Beenox games
Cancelled Nintendo DS games
Disney video games
Game Boy Advance games
MacOS games
GameCube games
PlayStation 2 games
Superhero video games
video game
THQ games
D3 Publisher games
Video games based on animated films
Video games based on films
Video games scored by Michael Giacchino
Video games set in the United States
Video games set on fictional islands
Video games with alternative versions
Video games with oblique graphics
Windows games
Xbox games
RenderWare games
Video games scored by Chris Tilton
3D platform games
Video games scored by Tim Simonec
Video games developed in the United States